Harry Willis was an Australian musician. He was of Jamaican descent.

He hosted a variety show on TV Aloha Hawaii (1958) and one on radio Harry Willis Entertains (1957). He also did some acting and sang the Calypso theme song for Long John Silver.

Acting appearances
Long John Silver (1954)
Jonah (1962)

References

External links
 Archive of ABC Weekly article about Harry Willis and his 1957 radio show

Australian people of Jamaican descent
Australian musicians
Date of birth missing